C/S Origin was an entertainment channel that was owned by Solar Entertainment Corporation. The flagship channel of C/S 9 (on free TV owned by RPN). It shows mostly American crime and suspense dramas, science-fiction, mysteries, reality and investigation. The initial broadcast was launched on September 14, 2008. This channel was available on Global Destiny Cable and SkyCable.

Solar Entertainment had decided "handover" all programs shown on C/S Origin back to its terrestrial channel, C/S 9, on July 15, 2009. C/S Origin, which was available on Global Destiny Cable and SkyCable, has now been replaced by Sci Fi Channel (now Universal Channel) on their respective channel line-up.

Profile
C/S (better known as Crime/Suspense), the home of the world's critically acclaimed and award-winning US television series, takes entertainment to the next level with C/S Origin. The channel that gives you an unparalleled selection of choice programming from the hottest shows to the latest seasons. To the most investigative factuals and blockbuster movies.

Programming

References

External links
 Solar Entertainment Channels at Lyngsat.com

Former Solar Entertainment Corporation channels
Television networks in the Philippines
Television channels and stations established in 2008
Television channels and stations disestablished in 2009